, better known by his stage name KOHH, is a Japanese hip hop recording artist from Oji, Kita, Tokyo.

Early life
Chiba was born in Oji, Kita, Tokyo. He was raised by a single mother along with his younger brother. His younger brother is also an up-and-coming rapper. His father committed suicide by jumping off an apartment building while high on drugs; his mother struggled with an addiction to methamphetamine. KOHH grew up around violence and drugs along with his crew of local friends who share the same experience. His tough environment along with his desire to become a rapper gave him a head start in the Japanese hip-hop scene.

Career
KOHH started producing and recording music at the age of 18 with while making various mixtapes, until he met producer 318 and started releasing material under the label GUNSMITH PRODUCTION. He saw an early underground success within the sub-urban Japanese scene when he produced the song "Young Forever" of his younger brother 'lil Kohh whose music video went viral in Japan.

In 2014 KOHH released his major 2nd studio album titled MONOCHROME. The album was a fair success among the urban acts and its lead track  had a big reception on YouTube.

In 2015, KOHH along with Japanese artist Loota collaborated with Keith Ape's track "잊지마" (It G Ma) which became a major hit single in Japan and South Korea apart from gaining international media attention. Back in Japan, KOHH resumed his work and continued working on his new album DIRT after releasing his delayed 1st album 梔子 (Gardenia).
DIRT was released on October 28. The album was also released internationally via iTunes in October 23. KOHH was featured along with OG Maco on the track "BUCHIAGARI" by Japanese DJ RYOW.

In 2016, KOHH collaborated with Frank Ocean on the single "Nikes", available on the physical album copy of Blonde. KOHH was featured in a new song from Japanese American superstar Hikaru Utada, titled "Bōkyaku", from her 6th Japanese album Fantôme. KOHH was featured in an exclusive bonus track "Runway", in the Japanese iTunes version of Mariah Carey's Caution album.

KOHH's fifth studio album Untitled was released by Nippon Columbia on February 2, 2019.

Reception
KOHH has been mentioned several times as a major influential force to the Japanese hip hop scene in recent years. KOHH has occasionally criticized how small the hip hop scene is in Japan and has tackled major mainstream TVs for its negligence of noticing hip hop. KOHH has also being praised for his smart use of topics like drug use and violence within the Japanese society which are considered controversial in the country. After being featured in "잊지마" (It G Ma), KOHH received an even bigger praise from international audiences who recognized his use of the phrase 'Arigatō' (Thank you) in his verse as the trademark of the hit song and praised the artist whose performance was the one that left the biggest impression on the track. 
M-flo's Taku Takahashi has appointed KOHH as one of the main acts in the Japanese hip hop renaissance.

Several videos featuring KOHH have gone viral on social media like YouTube, Facebook and Vine among others.

Discography

Studio albums

Mixtapes
 『YELLOW T△PE』(Released: November 28, 2012)
 『YELLOW T△PE 2』(Released: August 31, 2013)
 『YELLOW T△PE 3』(Released: June 30, 2015)
 『YELLOW T△PE 4』(Released: December 20, 2016)
 『Complete Collection 1』(Released: May 20, 2015)
 『Complete Collection 2』(Released: May 20, 2015)

Singles
 Keith Ape – 잊지마 (It G Ma) ft. JayAllday, loota, Okasian, Kohh
 HIROI SEKAI (Worldwide) – KOHH, J $tash, Young Sachi 
 KOHH & J $tash – Tatted up 
 J $tash X Kohh – HOOD RICH 
 J $tash x Kohh – Don't Get Me Started 
 KOHH, PETZ, Tokarev – 十人十色
 JOE IRON – Tomareranai feat. KOHH, Steelo & YUKI a.k.a. JUTO
 Y'S – プリンス feat.KOHH&MONY HORSE 
 DJ RYOW – Don't Stop Remix feat. DJ Ty-Koh, Kohh, Dizzle & Socks
 DJ RYOW – Turn Up feat KOHH, SMITH-CN & ZEEBRA 
 Goku Green – チョーヤバイ feat. KOHH & MONY HORSE
 VITO (SQUASH SQUAD) – I Need Her (Remix) feat. Cherry Brown, NIPPS, KOHH 
 般若 – 家族 feat. KOHH
 DJ SOULJAH – aaight feat. KOHH, MARIA (SIMI LAB)
 AKLO – Break The Records (Remix) feat. KOHH & 漢
 ANARCHY – MOON CHILD feat.KOHH
 ANARCHY – BANK TO BANK feat. KOHH 
 LORD 8ERZ – TROY feat. KOHH, 三島, RAW-T
 Lil Herb , Kohh, Seeda, Norikiyo – Chiraq 2 Japan 
 SD, Kohh, Sky-Hi – Ballin 
 DJ KEN WATANABE – G.O.L.D feat. KOHH
 DJ KEN WATANABE – G.O.L.D PART 2 feat. KOHH, Kayzabro & Y'S
  – Hate That Booty Feat.Y'S&KOHH
 T.O.P. – I'm So High feat. KOHH 
 KOWICHI – BOYFRIEND#2 REMIX feat. YOUNG HASTLE, KOHH & DJ TY-KOH
 JOYSTICKK – LOLLIPOP (DJ KM Remix) feat. KOHH 
 AKLO – NEW DAYS MOVE -REMIX- ft.SALU, STAXX T(CREAM), KOHH & SHINGO☆西成
 Brandon Thomas – 24 7 Feat. KOHH 
 DJ☆GO – MIX GRILLZ feat. KOHH, HORI
 DJ CHARI & DJ TATSUKI – GIMME THE LIGHTS(A.C.E.TIME) FEAT.YUKI A.K.A. JUTO,KOHH A.K.A. YELLOW T-20 & YOUNG FREEZ　
 Loota – Somewhere feat.KOHH
 SALU & the dreambandgunjo – ピラミッド feat. KOHH
 FIGHT FOR TOKYO – GIRAGIRAガールズ, 巌, MEGA-G, MC漢, MC SHOW, MCクローバー, Y'S, YOUNG HASTLE, KOHH, LOOTA,EGO, 海, エリカ
 HOPE-TOKYO TRIBE ANTHEM-（TRIBES UNITED VERSION）- 海, 巌, MC漢, MEGA-G, GIRAGIRAガールズ, D.O, T2K, Y'S, KOHH, 十影, YOUNG HASTLE, VITO FOCCACIO,LOOTA, EGO, MC SHOW 
 MINMI – #ヤッチャッタ featuring KOHH
 Barry Chen – AIR FORCE ONE Feat. MJ116 Kenzy & KOHH
TeddyLoid – Break'em all feat. KOHH
 DJ RYOW – BUCHIAGARI feat.KOHH & OG Maco 
 SOCKS – Bash feat.KOHH 
 RunWay (Remix) - Mariah Carey (prod. by Skrillex & Lido)
 タイプライター&YMG – Let me Know Feat. AK-69 & KOHH
 KOHH – PARIS (SAM TIBA REMIX)
 Frank Ocean – Nikes (Pop-Up Store Version)
 Hikaru Utada – Boukyaku feat. KOHH
 5lack – 24356 feat. KOHH
 CashPassion Ft. Dumbfoundead & KOHH – All In

Accolades

MTV Europe Music Award

|-
| 2017
| KOHH
| Best Japan Act 
| 
|}

Space Shower Music Video Awards

|-
| 2016
| KOHH
| Best Hip Hop Artist 
| 
|-
| 2017
| KOHH
| Best Hip Hop Artist 
| 
|}

External links
 Official Site

References

1990 births
Living people
Japanese male singers
Japanese lyricists
Japanese male composers
Japanese composers
Japanese rappers
Japanese hip hop musicians
Japanese male musicians
Singers from Tokyo
Japanese people of Korean descent
Naturalized citizens of Japan